Ileus is a disruption of the normal propulsive ability of the intestine. It can be caused by lack of peristalsis or by mechanical obstruction.
The word 'ileus' is from Ancient Greek eileós ("intestinal obstruction"). The term 'subileus' refers to a partial obstruction.

Signs and symptoms
Symptoms of ileus include, but are not limited to:
 moderate to severe, diffuse abdominal pain
 constipation
 abdominal distension
 nausea/vomiting, especially after meals
 vomiting of  bilious fluid
 lack of bowel movement and/or flatulence
 excessive belching

Cause
Decreased propulsive ability may be broadly classified as caused either by bowel obstruction or intestinal atony or paralysis. However, instances with symptoms and signs of a bowel obstruction occur, but with the absence of a mechanical obstruction, mainly in acute colonic pseudo-obstruction, Ogilvie's syndrome.

Bowel obstruction

A bowel obstruction is generally a mechanical obstruction of the gastrointestinal tract.

Intestinal paralysis
Paralysis of the intestine is often termed paralytic ileus, in which the intestinal paralysis need not be complete, but it must be sufficient to prohibit the passage of food through the intestine and lead to intestinal blockage.  Paralytic ileus is a common side effect of some types of surgery, commonly called postsurgical ileus. It can also result from certain drugs and from various injuries and illnesses, such as acute pancreatitis. Paralytic ileus causes constipation and bloating. On listening to the abdomen with a stethoscope, no bowel sounds are heard because the bowel is inactive.

A temporary paralysis of a portion of the intestines occurs typically after abdominal surgery. Since the intestinal content of this portion is unable to move forward, food or drink should be avoided until peristaltic sound is heard, by auscultation (use of a stethoscope) of the area where this portion lies. Intestinal atony or paralysis may be caused by inhibitory neural reflexes, inflammation or other implication of neurohumoral peptides.

Risk factors
 gastrointestinal surgery or other GI procedures
 electrolyte imbalance (Namely hypokalemia and hypercalcemia)
 diabetic ketoacidosis (DKA), and other causes of metabolic acidosis
 hypothyroidism
 diabetes
 medications (e.g. opioids or antimuscarinics)
 severe illness (Inflammation with peritonitis)
 spinal cord injury, those with injury above thoracic vertebrae 5 (T5) will have hypomotility problems within the bowel
 acute intermittent porphyria

Treatment
Traditionally, nothing by mouth was considered to be mandatory in all cases, but gentle feeding by enteral feeding tube may help to restore motility by triggering the gut's normal feedback signals, so this is the recommended management initially. When the patient has severe, persistent signs that motility is completely disrupted, nasogastric suction and parenteral nutrition may be required until passage is restored. In such cases, continuing aggressive enteral feeding causes a risk of perforating the gut.

Several options are available in the case of paralytic ileus. Most treatment is supportive. If caused by medication, the offending agent is discontinued or reduced. Bowel movements may be stimulated by prescribing lactulose, erythromycin or, in severe cases that are thought to have a neurological component (such as Ogilvie's syndrome), neostigmine. There is also evidence from a systematic review of randomized controlled trials that chewing gum, as a form of 'sham feeding', may stimulate gastrointestinal motility in the post-operative period and reduce the duration of postoperative ileus.

If possible the underlying cause is corrected (e.g. replace electrolytes).

Other animals
Ileus is a cause of colic in horses due to functional obstruction of the intestines. It is most commonly seen in horses postoperatively, especially following colic surgery. Horses experiencing ileus are at risk for gastric rupture due to rapid reflux build-up, and require intense medical management with frequent nasogastric intubation. Ileus may increase adhesion formation, because intestinal segments have more prolonged contact and intestinal distention causes serosal injury and ischemia. It is usually treated with aggressive fluid support, prokinetics, and anti-inflammatories.

Terminology
ICD-10 coding reflects both impaired-peristalsis senses and mechanical-obstruction senses of the term as modified by various adjectives. Some authors have argued for trying to reserve the term for the impaired-peristalsis senses, under which prescription certain older terms such as "gallstone ileus" and "meconium ileus", although now technically misnomers, are still accepted as correct owing to their long-established usage.

References

External links 

 
 Patient UK: Intestinal Obstruction and Ileus
 PubMed Health: Intestinal obstruction
 
 Merck Manual Professional: Ileus

Digestive system
Diseases of intestines